is a railway station in Naka-ku, Hamamatsu,  Shizuoka Prefecture, Japan, operated by the private railway company, Enshū Railway.

Lines
Kamijima Station is a station on the  Enshū Railway Line and is 4.5 kilometers from the starting point of the line at Shin-Hamamatsu Station.

Station layout
The station is an elevated station with dual opposed side platforms. It is staffed during daylight hours. The station building has automated ticket machines, and automated turnstiles which accept the NicePass smart card, as well as ET Card, a magnetic card ticketing system.

Platforms

Adjacent stations

|-
!colspan=5|Enshū Railway

Station History
Kamijima Station was established on December 6, 1909 with a single island platform . Freight operations began in 1956 with the completion of a large oil terminal nearby; freight operations were discontinued in 1975. The tracks were elevated and reconfigured to dual side platforms from 2008–2012.

Passenger statistics
In fiscal 2017, the station was used by an average of 1,726  passengers daily (boarding passengers only).

Surrounding area
Hamamatsu Baseball Stadium

See also
 List of railway stations in Japan

References

External links

 Enshū Railway official website

Railway stations in Japan opened in 1909
Railway stations in Shizuoka Prefecture
Railway stations in Hamamatsu
Stations of Enshū Railway